Miriam Argüello Morales (February 22, 1927 – February 7, 2019) was a politician from Nicaragua. A lawyer by training, she was the first woman to become president of the National Assembly of Nicaragua, where she served as a deputy for 22 years. She was elected Assembly president in 1990, defeating Alfredo César Aguirre though he had the support of Nicaraguan President Violeta Chamorro. However, César prevailed the following year, replacing Argüello in 1991.

In 1996, Argüello ran for President of Nicaragua as a member of the Popular Conservative Alliance (APC). Though in the previous term, both the Presidency and Vice-Presidency had been held by women--Chamorro and Julia Mena Rivera, respectively--few other women served in the Chamorro administration and in 1996 Argüello was the lone woman among 23 presidential candidates.

In 2007, Argüello allied with the Sandinista National Liberation Front (FSLN), but broke again with the ruling party in 2012 over the re-election of FSLN leader Daniel Ortega as President, saying the Supreme Court's ruling allowing Ortega a third term violated the Nicaraguan Constitution as well as legal precedent barring anyone from serving three terms as President or serving for two consecutive terms.

References

1927 births
2019 deaths
20th-century Nicaraguan lawyers
20th-century Nicaraguan women politicians
20th-century Nicaraguan politicians
Members of the National Assembly (Nicaragua)
Presidents of the National Assembly (Nicaragua)
Sandinista National Liberation Front politicians
Nicaraguan women lawyers